Transport in Mumbai is achieved by both public, and private transport. As of 2015, 52% of commuters use public transport. Mumbai has the largest organized bus transport network among major Indian cities.

Mumbai's public transport consists primarily of rapid transit on exclusive suburban railway lines augmented by commuter rail on main lines serving outlying suburbs, the bus services of the three municipalities making up the metropolitan area, public taxis and auto rickshaws, as well as ferry services. A metro and a monorail system were inaugurated in 2014. A commercial seaplane service was also introduced in 2014.

Road

Bus

Brihanmumbai Electric Supply and Transport (BEST) has a fleet of single, double decker buses and air-conditioned Tata Marcopolo CNG mini buses. BEST runs their buses all over Mumbai and outskirts like Navi Mumbai, Thane and Mira-Bhayandar.
Navi Mumbai Municipal Transport (NMMT) operates air-conditioned Volvo buses from Navi Mumbai to Bandra, Dadar, Mantralaya & Borivali and non A/C buses from Navi Mumbai to Mulund, Kurla, Dadar, Andheri, Dindoshi & Mantralaya.
Thane Municipal Transport (TMT) operates their buses from Thane to Mulund, Borivali, BKC & Andheri.
Mira-Bhayandar Municipal Transport (MBMT) operates their buses from Mira-Bhayandar to Jogeshwari and Borivali.

Taxis

Taxis arrived in 1911 to complement horse cars. Black and yellow Fiat taxis are an integral part of the city's heritage and have been depicted in numerous Bollywood movies. Metered taxis ply throughout Mumbai and have a monopoly from Bandra to Churchgate on the Western line and Sion to Chatrapati Shivaji Terminus on the Central line. Beyond Sion and Bandra auto rickshaws are not allowed and one has to hire a taxi. However, between Sion to Thane and Bandra to Bhayandar, both Taxis and autorickshaws are available to transport passengers.

 Silver-Green taxis run by Meru and Yellow-Red by Gold cabs and Black by Mega Cabs
 Blue and silver air-conditioned metered taxis known as "Cool Cabs"
 Some private taxi operators provide yellow number plate cars for transportation

Mumbai is served by two intra-city highways: Old Mumbai-Pune Highway and Mumbai-Ahmedabad Highway.

Number of taxis
There are around 58,000 taxis in Greater Mumbai and 98,566 in Mumbai MMR.

Classic black and yellow taxi numbers on Greater Mumbai roads had fallen to 20,000 by 2010 as 35,000 new taxis such as Maruti Alto, Wagon R and Omni, Tata Indica and Hyundai Santro joined the ranks. Recently State Transport Authority of Maharashtra State has also introduced the on-call facility to book these taxis, one can call 022-61234567 to book black and yellow (Non-AC) and CoolCabs (AC) taxis. Radio cab services have been introduced by some private companies. However, these taxis need to be booked in advance by calling their call center number.

Taxi Regulations
Law requires the driver of an unengaged taxi to take a passenger wherever they want to go, regardless of distance or time, if the fare meter of the unengaged rickshaw/taxi is in a 'For Hire' mode. The modes were denoted by older mechanical meters in this manner: a) upright – for hire b) half mast – not doing business c) facing down-currently hired.

Authorities encourage passengers to make complaints, for refusal to convey, excess fare, tampered meters, fake tariff cards, misconduct by drivers by direct email as well as by a website.

Rickshaws

Auto rickshaws play an important role in public transport in Mumbai. There are 246,458 black and yellow metered auto rickshaws, often simply called autos, in the Mumbai MMR as of 2008. Since 2002, all auto rickshaws have been required to use CNG as fuel. However, not all rickshaws comply. Mumbai MMRDA extends up to Thane M.C, Alibag, Badlapur, Bhiwandi M.C, Kaylan M.C. and Ulhasnagar M.C., and in these areas a CNG filling facility is not available, hence the fuel is either petrol or LPG.

Auto rickshaws are not permitted to enter Old Bombay. The southernmost points accessible to them are Bandra Fire Station in Western Mumbai and Sion Bus Depot in Central Mumbai. Auto rickshaws registered in Mumbai are not allowed travel beyond the municipal limits. They have been allowed to travel between Sion to Mulund in the Central Suburbs and up to Mankhurd on the Harbour line. People who wish to travel beyond Mumbai to suburbs like Vashi, Airoli have to catch a suburban rickshaw. In the western suburbs, they are allowed to travel between Bandra and Bhayandar only.

A mechanical meter decides the fare which is proportional to distance traveled. The Mumbai Metropolitan Region Transport Authority (MMRTA) updated the auto-rickshaw fares and declared a hike recently that is applied from 1 March 2021. The regulation for auto rickshaws is similar to taxis, and methods of complaining against the auto rickshaws and taxis are available on the Mumbai RTO website.

Survey

In 2021, UK-based car-sharing company Hiyacar has announced in a survey that Mumbai is the most stressful city in the world for driving. Public transportation options are one of the main factors which were observed for the survey.

Rail

Mumbai Suburban Railway

The Mumbai Suburban Railway is the oldest commuter rail in Asia, founded in 1853. It is owned by Indian Railways and operated by its Western Railways and Central Railways divisions. Most economical transport subsidized by the government of India via Railway ministry. With a length of 430 km, it has highest passenger density in the world, 7.5 million people daily, more than half of daily capacity of Indian Railways. It has four radial lines:

 Western between Churchgate and Dahanu Road
 Central between Chatrapati Shivaji Terminus (CST) and Kasara/Khopoli
 Harbour, running between CST and Panvel/Goregaon
 Trans-Harbour, running between Thane and Vashi/Panvel

Mumbai railways offer first class commuter transport. First class fares are approximately 10 times the second class fare and tend to be less crowded in the non-rush hour period. First class compartments also have slightly better seats than second class. While less crowded during non-peak hours, the first class compartments are rather more crowded during the peak hour time, as there is a large supply and demand gap. It is notoriously hard to get into the first class compartment as the coach is overcrowded with people hanging out of the doors.

Since 2017, Mumbai Suburban Rail became the first in India to operate Air-Conditioned rakes in its Western and Central line. These rakes are equipped with automatic doors and are vestibuled in a 12-coach configuration with coaches 1 to 6 vestibuled, motor connection between coaches 6 and 7 and coaches 7 to 12 again vestibuled.

There are also women-only cars (termed 'ladies'), and since 1992, 'Ladies Special' trains with all coaches reserved for women passengers.

Metro

In January 2004, a master transit plan was unveiled by the Mumbai Metropolitan Region Development Authority (MMRDA). The plan integrated a 146 kilometer-long metro system, of which 32 km would be underground.

In June 2004, government approval was given for a 12-station elevated line between Ghatkopar and Versova. In June 2006, the first phase of the Mumbai Metro project was inaugurated. Construction work began in February 2008. A successful trial run was conducted in May 2013, and the system's first line entered operation in June 2014, although some aspects of the project were afflicted by delays and cost issues. The Mumbai Metro opened on 8 June 2014. On 2 April 2022, Metro line 2A and 7 were inaugurated, these two lines have a combined length of 19,25 km and will reduce the traffic congestion in North Mumbai.

Many more lines are under-construction or planned having a total length of 345 km (215 mi).

Monorail

The Mumbai Monorail is a monorail system for the city of Mumbai. Construction began in January 2009 and the first operational line was inaugurated on 1 February 2014. It is being contracted by the Mumbai Metropolitan Region Development Authority and is the first monorail in India.

Four lines were proposed. Out of the two, Line 1 was opened to the public in 2014.
Initial plans were to build a line running from Malabar Hill to the Bandra-Kurla complex via the Haji Ali Dargah, Jacob Circle, Wadala Road, Sion Hospital and Dharavi. This was planned to have been opened by 2011.
A line from Thane to Bhiwandi via Kalyan. A consultant's report to government has recommended that this corridor be served instead by a road-based system for the next 10–15 years using buses and bus rapid transit. 
Chembur to Jacob Circle via Mahul. This route is planned to have been opened by December 2010. (May get extended to Vashi, Navi Mumbai.)
Lokhandwala Complex to Kanjurmarg via Oshiwara.
Additionally, previously planned Mumbai Metro corridors are also being examined to be made as monorail corridors instead of the metro by MMRDA due to the dense and congested areas these corridors pass through. The corridors are:
Hutatma Chowk – Ghatkopar – 21.8 km
Ghatkopar – Mulund – 12.4 km

Trams
Trams were an important form of transport until the mid-1960s. They were introduced in the late 19th century and in their heyday, covered many areas of the city. At their peak, route length grew to more than 47 kilometers. The system closed down in 1964.

Ferry

 from Vashi (in Navi Mumbai) to the Gateway of India.
 to Elephanta Caves and to nearby places such as Alibaug, Rewas, and Mandwa.
 in northern Mumbai across the Manori Creek. The barges operate at regular intervals across the shallow creek linking Manori to Malad.
 from Versova to Madh Island.
 Please check with the Local Authority If this service is operational or not.

Air

The Chhatrapati Shivaji Maharaj International Airport (formerly Sahar International Airport) is the main aviation hub in the city and the second busiest airport in India in terms of passenger traffic. It handled 30.74 million passengers and 656,369 tonnes of cargo during FY 2011–12.

The new integrated terminal T2 was inaugurated on 10 January 2014 and opened for international operations on 12 February 2014, increasing the capacity of the airport to 40 million passengers annually. A dedicated six lane, elevated road connecting the new terminal with the main arterial Western Express Highway was also opened to the public the same day.

The proposed Navi Mumbai International Airport to be built in the Kopra-Panvel area has been sanctioned by the Indian Government and will help relieve the increasing traffic burden on the existing airport.

The Juhu Aerodrome was India's first airport, and now hosts a flying club and a heliport.

See also
 Mumbai Urban Transport Project
 Timeline of Mumbai events
 Transport in India
 M-Indicator

References

External links
 Indian Railway Article on Mumbai Local Trains
 Indian Railway FAQ

Transport in Mumbai